Evaristo Ortíz (born 27 December 1960) is a Dominican Republic sprinter. He competed in the men's 100 metres at the 1988 Summer Olympics.

References

1960 births
Living people
Athletes (track and field) at the 1988 Summer Olympics
Dominican Republic male sprinters
Olympic athletes of the Dominican Republic
Place of birth missing (living people)
20th-century Dominican Republic people